Marston may refer to:

Places

United Kingdom
Marston, Cheshire, a village and civil parish
Marston, Herefordshire, a hamlet
Marston, Lincolnshire, a village and civil parish
Marston, Oxford, a village in Oxfordshire
Marston, Church Eaton, a location in Staffordshire
Marston, Milwich, a village and civil parish in Staffordshire
Marston, North Warwickshire, a location in Lea Marston parish, Warwickshire
Marston, Rugby, a location in Wolston parish, Warwickshire
Marston, Wiltshire, a village and civil parish
Marston Meysey or Marston Maisey, Wiltshire. a village and civil parish
South Marston, Swindon, Wiltshire, a village and civil parish

United States
Marston, Illinois, an unincorporated community
Marston, Missouri, a city
Marston, Maryland, an unincorporated community
Marston, North Carolina, an unincorporated community
Marston Lake, a reservoir in Denver, Colorado

Elsewhere
Marston, Quebec, Canada, a township municipality
Mount Marston, Victoria Land, Antarctica
Marston Glacier, Victoria Land, Antarctica

Other uses
Marston (name), a list of people and fictional characters with the given name or surname
Marston's (department store), former department store chain based in San Diego
Marston's plc (before 2007: Wolverhampton & Dudley Breweries), British pub and hotel operator
Marston Records, independent American record label, publisher of historical recordings
Marston Road, east of Oxford, England

See also
Marstons Mills, Massachusetts, USA
Marston Bigot, Somerset
Marston Green, West Midlands
Marston Magna, Somerset
Marston Meysey, Wiltshire
Marston Montgomery, Derbyshire
Marston Moor, site of the Battle of Marston Moor, North Yorkshire
Marston Moreteyne, Bedfordshire
Marston on Dove, Derbyshire
Marston St. Lawrence, Northamptonshire
Marston Trussell, Northamptonshire
Marston Vale, Bedfordshire
Butlers Marston, Warwickshire
Fleet Marston, Buckinghamshire
Lea Marston, Warwickshire
Long Marston, Hertfordshire
Long Marston, North Yorkshire 
Long Marston, Warwickshire
New Marston, Oxford
North Marston, Buckinghamshire
Potters Marston, Leicestershire
Priors Marston, Warwickshire
South Marston, Swindon, Wiltshire
Marston mats, perforated steel sheets used during World War II for building airstrips